Gaël Perdriau (born 8 July 1972) is a French politician, the current mayor of Saint-Étienne.

In 2022, Perdriau is being investigated by police after it was claimed he was involved in a plot to film the “erotic massage” given by an escort boy to his conservative Catholic deputy, Gilles Artigues, in a Paris hotel room in 2014. The tape was used to blackmail him for eight years to stop him from challenging Perdiau until the recording was publicized by a French news site in 2022. After the story broke, Artigues filed a criminal lawsuit against both Perdriau and his chief of staff, alleging “aggravated blackmail, the organization of an ambush and embezzlement.” The suit in turn sparked a judicial investigation. Both accused men deny the claims.

References

1972 births
Living people
Mayors of Saint-Étienne
People from Cholet
The Republicans (France) politicians
Politicians from Auvergne-Rhône-Alpes